The Niobrara River (literally "water spread-out horizontal-the" or "The Wide-Spreading Water") is a tributary of the Missouri River, approximately  long, running through the U.S. states of Wyoming and Nebraska.  The river drains one of the most arid sections of the Great Plains, and has a low flow for a river of its length. The Niobrara's watershed includes the northern tier of Nebraska Sandhills, a small south-central section of South Dakota, as well as a small area of eastern Wyoming.

Course
The river rises in the High Plains of Wyoming, in southern Niobrara County. The Niobrara flows east as an intermittent stream past Lusk and southeast into northwestern Nebraska. It then flows southeast across the Pine Ridge country of Sioux County, then east through Agate Fossil Beds National Monument, past Marsland, and through Box Butte Reservoir. The stream flows east across northern Nebraska, near the northern edge of the Sandhills and past Valentine. The river joins the Missouri northwest of Niobrara in northern Knox County, just upstream of Lewis and Clark Lake.

Discharge
Although the annual runoff is low relative to the size of its drainage basin, the Niobrara has a stronger and more consistent flow than many other streams in the region. An estimated 70 percent of the river's water results from seepage from the Ogallala Aquifer that underlies the area, with the remaining 30 percent from precipitation. The river is highest in the spring and early summer (February through April) and lowest in early fall (August and September). By late fall, river levels begin to rise as demands for river water for irrigation subside.

History
The lower Niobrara valley is the traditional home of the Ponca tribe of Native Americans. Between 1861 and 1882, the stretch of the Niobrara River from the mouth of the Keya Paha to its confluence with the Missouri marked the boundary between Nebraska and the Dakota Territory.

National Scenic River

A  stretch of the Niobrara River in central Nebraska, from the town of Valentine east to Nebraska State Highway 137, has been designated as the Niobrara National Scenic River since 1991. It is managed by the Department of the Interior (U.S. Fish & Wildlife Service and National Park Service) to protect the water quality, geologic, paleontologic, fish and wildlife, scenic and recreation values.

Most of the lands within the boundary of the National Scenic River are, and will remain, in private ownership. Management is based upon working with private, county, state and federal landowners and stakeholders to coordinate protection of the river while ensuring a quality experience for river visitors. The U.S. Fish and Wildlife Service manages the 9 miles of river that flow through the Fort Niobrara Refuge primarily for wilderness and wildlife habitat, but allows recreation downstream from Cornell Dam.  The National Park Service manages the remaining 67 miles, acting as a facilitator for resource protection by landowners and river users, providing law enforcement and visitor education services, and coordinating resource management activities.

River modifications

The Box Butte Dam, completed in 1946 by the U.S. Bureau of Reclamation (USBR), is the only major dam on the Niobrara River proper. Located in Dawes County in western Nebraska, the dam is part of the Mirage Flats Project, which irrigates  on the north side of the Niobrara River.

The project is part of the Ainsworth Unit of the Pick-Sloan Missouri Basin Program, also operated by the USBR.

Cornell Dam, built in 1915 at the confluence of Minnechaduza Creek near Valentine, generated power until 1985. The following year the dam was acquired by the U.S. Department of the Interior. Although officially decommissioned, the dam remains standing. The feasibility of removing the defunct dam has been studied, although the accumulation of sediment behind the dam, which may include high levels of chemicals from pesticides, may be harmful to the river environment if released.

The dam was built in 1927 and was operated by the Nebraska Public Power District. It includes two Westinghouse generators, with a combined capacity of 3,000 KW. In a 2015 agreement with Nebraska local and state government entities, NPPD agreed to decommission the dam in 2017. The dam was breached by flooding caused by a March 2019 storm.

Native American languages
In the Cheyenne language, the river is Hisse Yovi Yoe, meaning "surprise river"; in Pawnee, Kíckatariʾ; and in Lakota, Wakpá Tȟáŋka.

See also
Agate Fossil Beds National Monument
Box Butte Reservoir 
Fort Niobrara, a U.S. Army outpost (1880–1906)
Fort Niobrara National Wildlife Refuge
Niobrara National Scenic River
Niobrara State Park, located at the confluence of the Niobrara and Missouri Rivers
Samuel R. McKelvie National Forest
Smith Falls
List of longest rivers of the United States (by main stem)
List of Nebraska rivers
List of Wyoming rivers

References

External links
Niobrara National Scenic River - U.S. National Park Service
Niobrara State Park - Nebraska Game and Parks Commission
Smith Falls State Park - Nebraska Game and Parks Commission 
Fort Niobrara National Wildlife Refuge - U.S. Fish & Wildlife Service
Agate Fossil Beds National Monument - U.S. National Park Service

Rivers of Nebraska
Rivers of Wyoming
Tributaries of the Missouri River
Rivers of Sioux County, Nebraska
Rivers of Dawes County, Nebraska
Rivers of Boyd County, Nebraska
Rivers of Cherry County, Nebraska
Rivers of Knox County, Nebraska
Rivers of Keya Paha County, Nebraska
Rivers of Brown County, Nebraska
Rivers of Rock County, Nebraska
Rivers of Sheridan County, Nebraska
Rivers of Holt County, Nebraska
National Park Service Wild and Scenic Rivers
Federal lands in Nebraska
National Park Service areas in Nebraska
Wild and Scenic Rivers of the United States